Sherburne County is a county in Central Minnesota. At the 2020 census, the population was 97,183. The county seat is Elk River.

Sherburne County is included in the Minneapolis-St. Paul-Bloomington, MN-WI Metropolitan Statistical Area.

History
The Wisconsin Territory was established by the federal government effective 3 July 1836, and existed until its eastern portion was granted statehood (as Wisconsin) in 1848. Therefore, the federal government set up the Minnesota Territory effective March 3, 1849. The newly organized territorial legislature created nine counties across the territory in October of that year. One of those original counties, Benton, had its southern section partitioned off on 25 February 1856 to form a new county. It was named Sherburne, to recognize Moses Sherburne (1808-1868), a prominent area attorney, associate justice of the Supreme Court of the Minnesota Territory (1853-1857), who retired to the county and spent his final year of life there (in Orono).

The area now delineated by Big Lake Township was first settled in 1848; the small village was named Humboldt. When the county creation was announced in 1856, Humboldt was named the county seat. The area now covered by Elk River was also first settled in 1848. Two villages grew up, fairly close together: Orono (platted 1855); and Elk River Village (platted 1865). Their growth was such that by 1867 a county vote moved the county seat from Humboldt to Elk River (designated as "The Lower Town" in the vote, to distinguish it from nearby Orono. The two villages merged under the name 'Elk River' in 1881). Also in 1867, the village of Humboldt changed its name to Big Lake.

The boundaries of Sherburne County have remained as created since 1856.

Geography

The Mississippi River flows southeast along the county's south border. The Rum River flows southeast through the county's upper east portion. The Elk River rises in nearby Benton County, and flows south-southeast through the western and southern part of Sherburne County, discharging into the Mississippi at Elk River. The Saint Francis River also rises in Benton and flows southward through the central part of Sherburne County, discharging into the Elk just north of Big Lake.

The terrain of Sherburne County consists of low rolling hills, partially wooded, heavily sprinkled with lakes, ponds and depressions. The soil of Sherburne County contains considerable sand and gravel due to glacial activity in past epochs, and thus is less suitable for agriculture than much of Minnesota. The county terrain slopes to the south and east. The county's highest point lies 3 miles (5 km) east-southeast of Saint Cloud, at 1,110' (338m) ASL.

Major highways

  U.S. Highway 10
  U.S. Highway 169
  Minnesota State Highway 24
  Minnesota State Highway 25
  Minnesota State Highway 101
  Minnesota State Highway 301

Airports
 Leaders Clear Lake Airport (8Y6) - one mile (1.6 km) east of Clear Lake
 Princeton Municipal Airport (PNM) - at SW edge of Princeton (on border between Mille Lacs and Sherburne counties)
 St. Cloud Regional Airport (STC) - two miles (3 km) east of Saint Cloud

Adjacent counties

 Mille Lacs County - north
 Isanti County - northeast
 Anoka County - east
 Hennepin County - southeast
 Wright County - southwest
 Stearns County - west
 Benton County - northwest

Protected areas

 Bridgeview Park Reserve
 Clear Lake Scientific and Natural Area
 Fremont Wildlife Management Area
 Grams Regional Park
 Harry W. Cater Homestead Prairie Scientific and Natural Area
 Island View Regional Park
 Oak Savanna Park
 Rice Lake Savanna Scientific and Natural Area
 Sand Dunes State Forest
 Sand Prairie Wildlife Management Area
 Sherburne National Wildlife Refuge
 Uncas Dunes Scientific and Natural Area
 William H. Houlton Conservation Area

Demographics

2020 census

Note: the US Census treats Hispanic/Latino as an ethnic category. This table excludes Latinos from the racial categories and assigns them to a separate category. Hispanics/Latinos can be of any race.

2000 census

At the 2000 United States census, there were 64,417 people, 21,581 households and 16,746 families in the county. The population density was 148/sq mi (57.4/km2). There were 22,827 housing units at an average density of 52.7/sq mi (20.4/km2). The county's racial makeup was 96.73% White, 0.85% Black or African American, 0.45% Native American, 0.58% Asian, 0.02% Pacific Islander, 0.43% from other races, and 0.95% from two or more races. 1.10% of the population were Hispanic or Latino of any race. 40.1% were of German, 13.6% Norwegian, 7.5% Swedish and 6.2% Irish ancestry.

There were 21,581 households, of which 44.90% had children under the age of 18 living with them, 66.20% were married couples living together, 7.50% had a female householder with no husband present, and 22.40% were non-families. 15.70% of all households were made up of individuals, and 5.20% had someone living alone who was 65 years of age or older. The average household size was 2.91 and the average family size was 3.27.

The county population contained 30.9% under the age of 18, 9.60% from 18 to 24, 33.90% from 25 to 44, 18.40% from 45 to 64, and 7.10% who were 65 years of age or older. The median age was 31 years. For every 100 females there were 104.30 males. For every 100 females age 18 and over, there were 103.20 males.

The median household income was $57,014 and the median family income was $61,790. Males had a median income of $41,601 and females $27,689. The per capita income for the county was $21,322. About 2.30% of families and 4.40% of the population were below the poverty line, including 3.50% of those under age 18 and 10.10% of those age 65 or over.

Communities

Cities

 Becker
 Big Lake
 Clear Lake
 Elk River (county seat)
 Princeton (part)
 St. Cloud (part)
 Zimmerman

Unincorporated communities

 Bailey
 Briggs Lake
 Cable
 Orrock
 Salida
 Santiago

Townships

 Baldwin Township
 Becker Township
 Big Lake Township
 Blue Hill Township
 Clear Lake Township
 Haven Township
 Livonia Township
 Orrock Township
 Palmer Township
 Santiago Township

Politics
Sherburne County has traditionally voted Republican. Since 1980 the county has selected the Republican Party candidate in 80% of national elections (as of 2020).

See also
 Great River Regional Library
 National Register of Historic Places listings in Sherburne County, Minnesota

References

External links
 Sherburne County government’s website

 
Minneapolis–Saint Paul
Minnesota counties
Minnesota counties on the Mississippi River
1856 establishments in Minnesota Territory
Populated places established in 1856